Aleksandra Crvendakić (born 17 March 1996) is a Serbian professional women's basketball player who plays for LDLC ASVEL Féminin of the French Ligue 1 and EuroLeague Women. She also represents the Serbian national basketball team.

International career
She represented Serbian national basketball team at the 2016 Olympic Games.

References

External links
 Profile at eurobasket.com
 
 
 
 

1996 births
Living people
Sportspeople from Loznica
Power forwards (basketball)
Serbian women's basketball players
ŽKK Crvena zvezda players
Basketball players at the 2016 Summer Olympics
Olympic basketball players of Serbia
Olympic bronze medalists for Serbia
Serbian expatriate basketball people in Hungary
Serbian expatriate basketball people in Poland
Medalists at the 2016 Summer Olympics
Olympic medalists in basketball
European champions for Serbia
Basketball players at the 2020 Summer Olympics